The Cold Light of Day is a 2012 American action thriller film directed by Mabrouk El Mechri and distributed by Summit Entertainment. It was written by Scott Wiper and John Petro and stars Henry Cavill, Bruce Willis, and Sigourney Weaver. The story follows Will (Cavill), who finds that his family has been kidnapped by foreign agents who are searching for a briefcase stolen by his father (Willis), which forces him to take matters into his own hands to find them.

The film was produced by Intrepid Pictures and was released on September 7, 2012. It received negative reviews and has a 4% approval rating on Rotten Tomatoes.

Plot
Will Shaw, who owns a consultancy business in San Francisco that is about to go into insolvency, reluctantly visits his family in Spain for a holiday. He is met there by his father, Martin, an adviser for the U.S. government, with whom he has a tense relationship. 

Will's preoccupation with his phone results in a sailing accident where Will leaps to save his brother's girlfriend Dara from being hit by the yacht's boom but she hits her head on a winch. Martin grabs the phone and throws it into the ocean. Will swims to town to fetch medical supplies and to cool down. 

When Will returns, the yacht has moved and his family is no longer inside. He goes to the police and they lead him to Zahir, who knows where his family is. He senses something is amiss, and attempts to escape in a police car. Martin appears, and helps Will by beating the officers.

Martin reveals he is a CIA agent, and that the people who kidnapped their family are after a briefcase he had taken on an assignment. Martin meets his CIA team leader Jean Carrack in Madrid, who claims she no longer has the briefcase, but he knows she is lying. 

As Martin returns to his car, Gorman, a sniper, kills him. Will retrieves his phone as Gorman starts shooting at him and gives chase. As Will escapes, he takes a call from the kidnappers, who want to speak to "Tom", providing a 21 hour deadline and a meeting point to exchange the briefcase for his family.

Receiving no help from the US embassy, Will is picked up by Carrack in a car outside, but he realizes she is untrustworthy. He feigns illness and she, disgusted by the thought of him vomiting in her car, has the car pulled over and Will gets away. 

Will arranges a meeting with his father's friend Diego at his office and meets receptionist Lucia Caldera, Diego's niece, where he fights off one of Carrack's men. The pair go to Diego's apartment, but they find that he has been killed by Carrack and Gorman. 

Will and Lucia escape across the rooftops, but he is shot. She takes him to a nightclub, to a friend who has medical experience who cauterizes the wound. Lucia explains that "Tom" is Martin's alias in Spain, and she is Will's half-sister, Martin's daughter by another woman. 

As Will arrives at the meeting point, he is grabbed and tortured for his father's whereabouts by the kidnappers, actually Israeli Mossad agents led by Zahir, who was using the briefcase to lure a traitor when Martin stole it from them. They realize Carrack framed Martin and she has the briefcase, so they want Will to lure her out. He briefly sees his family before Zahir releases him.

Will meets Lucia at the nightclub, where she starts a tab on Carrack's credit card. Gorman appears and is subdued by bouncers at the club and tortured for information but he refuses to budge. Will lets Gorman escape so he lead them to Carrack, who tries to sell the briefcase in an underground car park. Zahir's men surround them but give away their position, so Carrack and Gorman open fire on their own buyers before starting to attack and escape from Mossad, during which Lucia hits (the already shot) Gorman in a car crash who dies, enraging Carrack as she flees. 

Will and Lucia pursue Carrack through Madrid, with Carrack indiscriminately causing death and destruction along the way, until eventually their cars collide and Lucia is seriously injured. Just as Carrack is about to shoot Will, she is killed by Zahir with a sniper rifle, who retrieves the briefcase and releases his family. Lucia recovers in the hospital and Will looks on at his new expanded family. He is offered a job in the CIA; whether he accepts is left unresolved.

Cast
 Henry Cavill as Will Shaw
 Sigourney Weaver as Jean Carrack
 Bruce Willis as Martin Shaw
 Verónica Echegui as Lucia Caldera
 Caroline Goodall as Laurie Shaw
 Rafi Gavron as Josh Shaw
 Joseph Mawle as Gorman
 Óscar Jaenada as Maximo
 Lolo Herrero as Reynaldo
 Mark Ullod as Vicente
 Emma Hamilton as Dara Collins
 Michael Budd as Esmael
 Alex Amaral as Cesar
 Jim Piddock as Meckler
 Paloma Bloyd as Cristiana
 Roschdy Zem as Zahir
 Colm Meaney as CIA Agent

Production
The film was shot in Spain, including at Teulada-Moraira and Xàbia on the Costa Blanca. It was released on April 6, 2012 in the United Kingdom and September 7, 2012 in the United States.

Box office
The Cold Light of Day grossed $1.8 million in its opening weekend and $25.4 million worldwide, against a budget of $20 million.

Reception
The film was panned by reviewers and holds a 4% rating on Rotten Tomatoes, based on 45 reviews, with an average rating of 2.7/10. On Metacritic, the film has a score of 22 out of 100 from 10 critics, indicating "generally unfavorable reviews". Audiences polled by CinemaScore gave the film an average grade of "D+" on an A+ to F scale. The New York Times described the film as a "thoroughly incompetent 'Bourne' movie imitation".

References

External links
 
 

2012 films
2012 action thriller films
American action thriller films
Films about kidnapping
Films about the Central Intelligence Agency
Films set in Madrid
Films set in Spain
Films shot in Madrid
Films shot in Spain
Spanish action thriller films
Summit Entertainment films
Lionsgate films
Intrepid Pictures films
Films scored by Lucas Vidal
2010s English-language films
2010s American films